The Hesse Cup (German: Hessenpokal) is one of the 21 regional cup competitions of German football. The winner of the competition gains entry to the first round of the German Cup.

History
The Cup was established in 1945, after the end of the Second World War, in the state of Hessen, which then was part of the US occupation zone in Germany.

The Hessen Cup is played annually.

From 1974 onwards, the winner of the Hessen Cup qualified for the first round of the German Cup.

Modus
Professional clubs are not permitted to enter the competition, meaning, no teams from the Bundesliga and the 2. Bundesliga can compete.

In 2008–09, the best 15 teams of the regional cups in Hesse qualified for the first round of the Hesse Cup. All clubs from Hesse playing in the Regionalliga and below take part in these competitions. Additionally, Kickers Offenbach and SV Wehen Wiesbaden are the two clubs from Hesse in the 3. Liga, so they qualify directly for the Hesse Cup.

The final is played at a neutral location but the two finalists can agree to play the game at one of the two clubs home ground.

Cup finals
Held annually at the end of season, these are the cup finals since 1945:

 Source: 
 Winners in bold

Winners & finalists
Listed in order of wins, the Cup winners are:

 Winning finals in bold.
 † Achieved by reserve team.
 1 The 1947 cup final was replayed twice, with the first two games having ended drawn 3–3 and 2–2.
 2 The 1953 final had to be replayed because the first game ended in a 1–1 draw.
 3 The 1957 final was called off after 65 minutes because of crowd trouble and the SV Kilianstädten walking off the field. The game was awarded with the score at the time it was called off.
 4 The 1962 final had to be replayed because the first game ended in a 1–1 draw after extra time.

References

Sources
Deutschlands Fußball in Zahlen,  An annual publication with tables and results from the Bundesliga to Verbandsliga/Landesliga, publisher: DSFS

External links
Fussball.de: Hesse Cup 
Hessian football federation website 

Recurring sporting events established in 1945
Football cup competitions in Germany
Football competitions in Hesse
1945 establishments in Germany